Theodor Obrietan (born 2 December 1927) was an Austrian rower. He competed in the men's coxed four event at the 1948 Summer Olympics.

References

External links
 

1927 births
Possibly living people
Austrian male rowers
Olympic rowers of Austria
Rowers at the 1948 Summer Olympics
Place of birth missing